K. Sri Dhammananda (born Martin Gamage, 18 March 1919 – 31 August 2006) was a Sri Lankan Buddhist monk and scholar.

Early life
Born in the village of Kirinde in Matara, Sri Lanka, Dhammananda spent most of his life and career in Malaysia. He was ordained as a novice monk (samanera) at the age of 12 and was fully ordained in 1940. After arriving in Malaya, now part of Malaysia, in 1952, Dhammananda established himself as the foremost Theravada Buddhist monk in Malaysia and Singapore.He was honored with Aggamaha Saddhammajotikadhaja award by the Myanmar government in 2000.

Death

Dr. Dhammananda passed away on 31 August 2006 at the Subang Jaya Medical Centre in Malaysia. It was claimed that there were auspicious signs including lights and auras around the funeral site.

References

External links

 Dhammananda home page
 
 Books & Articles by K Sri Dhammananda
 Archive: Funeral of the late Chief Venerable K Sri Dhammananda

1919 births
2006 deaths
Buddhist apologists
Theravada Buddhism writers
Theravada Buddhist monks
Sinhalese writers
Sri Lankan Buddhist monks
Sri Lankan Buddhist missionaries
Sri Lankan Theravada Buddhists
Malaysian Theravada Buddhists
People from Southern Province, Sri Lanka
Malaysian people of Sri Lankan descent
20th-century Buddhist monks